The Daffy Duckaroo is a Warner Bros. Looney Tunes cartoon directed by Norman McCabe. The cartoon was released on October 24, 1942, and stars Daffy Duck. The film is set in the American West, and Daffy plays a singing cowboy (a genre of Western film popular at the time).

Plot
On a donkey and pulling a trailer, recently retired singing cowboy Daffy Duckaroo moves from Hollywood to the American West, where he comes upon an Indian encampment. He is about to run away when he is wooed by an Indian girl. He serenades her and follows her into her teepee.

The Indian girl, actually a New Yorker named Daisy June, says she would love to be Daffy's girlfriend, but her boyfriend, a hulking Indian man named Little Beaver with a reputation for taking scalps, will never allow it. When Little Beaver arrives, Daffy hides in a dresser and emerges disguised as an Indian girl himself. Little Beaver quickly forgets Daisy June and falls for the costumed Daffy.

When Little Beaver discovers Daffy's ruse, he chases Daffy through the Painted Desert, the Petrified Forest and into Los Angeles until he calls for aid with smoke signals.  The Indians surround Daffy's trailer, and in a non sequitur ending, they remove the tires and run off, only for an Indian to return them a few seconds later as they do not fit his golf cart; a sign reading "keep it under 40" is seen on the back of the cart as the cartoon ends.

As with most Warner Bros. cartoons of the era, the cartoon is peppered with then-current pop culture gags . A shootout during the chase contains no bullets, as Daffy has saved them "for the Army" and the World War II effort; the "keep it under 40" ending is also a reference to the 35 mph speed limit imposed during the war to ration gasoline.

References

External links
 
 

1942 films
1942 animated films
1942 short films
1940s animated short films
1940s Western (genre) comedy films
American Western (genre) comedy films
Looney Tunes shorts
Warner Bros. Cartoons animated short films
Western (genre) animated films
Daffy Duck films
Films directed by Norman McCabe
Films scored by Carl Stalling
American black-and-white films
1942 comedy films
1940s Warner Bros. animated short films